Slow Drag is a jazz album by trumpeter Donald Byrd recorded in 1967 and released on the Blue Note label as BST 84292.

Track listing 
 "Slow Drag" (Byrd) – 9:47
 "Secret Love" (Sammy Fain, Paul Francis Webster) – 3:57
 "Book's Bossa" (Walter Booker, Walton) – 6:52
 "Jelly Roll" (Sonny Red Kyner) – 5:21
 "The Loner" (Ronnie Mathews, Walton) – 6:17
 "My Ideal" (Richard A. Whiting, Newell Chase, Leo Robin) – 6:21

Personnel 
 Donald Byrd - trumpet
 Sonny Red - alto sax
 Cedar Walton - piano
 Walter Booker - bass
 Billy Higgins - drums (vocals on "Slow Drag")

References

1968 albums
Albums produced by Alfred Lion
Blue Note Records albums
Donald Byrd albums
Hard bop albums